Paul Showler (born 10 October 1966) is an English retired footballer. He began as a trainee at Sheffield Wednesday but after failing to get a professional contract he juggled a job as a police officer with non-league football. He returned to league football with Barnet, where he became a firm favourite down the left wing, becoming known for his goalscoring corner kicks. He later moved to Bradford City and Luton Town, before retiring in 1999.

He graduated from the University of Salford in 1999 with a degree in Physiotherapy  and became a physiotherapist at Peterborough United.

References

Boy From Brazil profile
Altrincham FC profile

1966 births
Living people
Sportspeople from Batley
English footballers
Association football wingers
Sheffield Wednesday F.C. players
Bentley Victoria Welfare F.C. players
Goole Town F.C. players
Colne Dynamoes F.C. players
Altrincham F.C. players
Barnet F.C. players
Bradford City A.F.C. players
Luton Town F.C. players
English Football League players
Alumni of the University of Salford
Association football physiotherapists